Molodyozhny is a rural locality (a settlement) in Yavengskoye Rural Settlement, Vozhegodsky District, Vologda Oblast, Russia. The population was 165 as of 2002.

Geography 
Molodyozhny is located 10 km north of Vozhega (the district's administrative centre) by road. Syamba is the nearest rural locality.

References 

Rural localities in Vozhegodsky District